The Cuyón River is a river of Aibonito that also passes through Coamo in Puerto Rico.

See also

 Puente de las Calabazas: NRHP-listed bridge near Coamo, Puerto Rico
 List of rivers of Puerto Rico

References

External links
 USGS Hydrologic Unit Map – Caribbean Region (1974)

Rivers of Puerto Rico